Slavyansky (masculine), Slavyanskaya (feminine), or Slavyanskoye (neuter) may refer to:

People
Fyodor Slavyansky (1817–1876), Russian painter

Places
Slavyansky District, a district of Krasnodar Krai, Russia
Slavyanskoye Urban Settlement, several municipal urban settlements in Russia
Slavyansky (rural locality) (Slavyanskoye, Slavyanskaya), several rural localities in Russia
Slavyansky District, alternative name of Sloviansk Raion, Ukraine
Slavyanskaya Square, Moscow
Slavyansky Bulvar, Moscow Metro station, Moscow, Russia

Other uses
FC Slavyansky Slavyansk-na-Kubani, an association football club from Russia
Slavyansky Bazaar, event in Belarus

See also
Slavic (disambiguation)
Slavyansk (disambiguation)
Slavyanka (disambiguation)